George Washington is an outdoor equestrian statue by the American sculptor Frederick Roth located near the Ford Mansion, Washington's Headquarters, in Morristown, New Jersey, United States. It was commissioned by philanthropist E. Mabel Clark to commemorate General George Washington's importance to the history of the city. The bronze sculpture was dedicated on October 19, 1928, the anniversary of the surrender of British General Charles Cornwallis at Yorktown in 1781.

History
Morristown was the site of two winter encampments by the Continental Army during the American Revolutionary War. The first one was from January to May 1777, with Washington's headquarters at Arnold's Tavern. The second one was from December 1779 to June 1780, with Washington's headquarters at the Ford Mansion.

E. Mabel Clark was the daughter of Charles F. Clark, President of the Bradstreet Company, now Dun & Bradstreet. The family lived in New York City and had a country house, Fairacres, in the Normandy Park section of Morristown. She commissioned Frederick Roth for an equestrian statue of Washington and specified that the horse be modeled after the workhorse she had seen pulling a milk wagon in New York. Roth was known as an animal sculptor, especially for his 1925 Statue of Balto in New York's Central Park. He finished  and had the statue cast in Florence, Italy, at the bronze works foundry of Gusmano Vignali . The installation site, a small triangular plot bounded by Morris and Washington Avenues, was donated to the city by Dr. Henry M. Dodge. Clark donated the statue to the city at the dedication on October 19, 1928. Speakers included Mayor Clyde W. Potts and Justice Charles W. Parker of the New Jersey Supreme Court. The sculptor attended the ceremony and was honored at a reception hosted by Clark.

Description
The sculpture depicts Washington in winter, wearing a uniform with a mantle and tricorner hat. The sculptor signed it: F.G.R. Roth. The front of the base is inscribed: Washington, the back is inscribed:

Legacy
A photograph of the statue, with Washington's Headquarters in the background, was featured in the booklet for the dedication of the Morristown National Historical Park on July 4, 1933. Clark was a member of the reception committee. The statue was surveyed by the Save Outdoor Sculpture program of the Smithsonian American Art Museum in 1994.

Gallery

See also
 List of Washington's Headquarters during the Revolutionary War
 List of statues of George Washington
 List of sculptures of presidents of the United States
 List of equestrian statues in the United States
 New Jersey in the American Revolution

References

External links
 
 
 

Morristown, New Jersey
Statues of George Washington
1927 sculptures
Bronze sculptures in New Jersey
Equestrian statues in New Jersey
Monuments and memorials in New Jersey
Monuments and memorials to George Washington in the United States
Outdoor sculptures in New Jersey
Sculptures of men in New Jersey
New Jersey in the American Revolution